The 1999 Ondrej Nepela Memorial was the 7th edition of an annual senior-level international figure skating competition held in Bratislava, Slovakia. It took place between September 24 and 26, 1999. Skaters competed in four disciplines: men's singles, ladies' singles, pair skating, and ice dancing. The competition is named for 1972 Olympic gold medalist Ondrej Nepela.

Results

Men

Ladies

Pairs

Ice dancing

External links
 7th Ondrej Nepela Memorial

Ondrej Nepela Memorial, 1999
Ondrej Nepela Memorial
Ondrej Nepela Memorial, 1999